The estuaries of Western Australia (also known as the Inlets of Western Australia) are located along the coastline of Western Australia.

The coastline can be considered in three main sections: south, west, and Kimberley. Some estuarine features carry through all three regions.

Wetlands and estuaries of the south west region have very similar ecologies and occurrences of biota.

South
The estuary/inlet names do not necessarily relate to the names of the rivers that flow into them.

(This list is along the coast from the east near Esperance to the west near Cape Leeuwin.)

 Barker
 Stokes Inlet
 Torradup
 Oldfield Estuary
 Jerdacuttup
 Culham Inlet
 Hamersley
 Dempster
 Fitzgerald
 St Marys
 Gordon Inlet
 Wellstead Estuary
 Beaufort Inlet
 Cheyne
 Waychinicup
 Normans
 Taylor Inlet
 Oyster Harbour
 Torbay Inlet
 Wilson Inlet
 Parry
 Irwin Inlet
 Nornalup Inlet
 Broke Inlet
 Gardner
 Warren
 Donnelly
 Hardy Inlet

West
 Harvey Estuary
 Peel Inlet

Kimberley
 Cambridge Gulf and Ord River

See also
 Estuaries of Australia

Notes

 
Coastline of Western Australia
 
Western Australia geography-related lists